Shavkat Mirziyoyev's tenure as the 2nd President of Uzbekistan began with his inauguration 14 December 2016, after serving as prime minister (2003–16) and acting president (8 September–14 December 2016) following the death of his predecessor, Islam Karimov. In accordance with the Constitution of Uzbekistan, his mandate will last until 2026, following his re-election in 2021.

Mirziyoyev's background and 2016 election 

Shavkat Miromonovich Mirziyoyev (Uzbek Cyrillic: Шавкат Миромонович Мирзиёев) was born in the Jizzakh Region of the Uzbek SSR on 24 July 1957 as one of 5 children that his father Miromon had with his wife. From 1977–1981, Mirziyoyev studied at the Tashkent Institute of Irrigation and Melioration with a Ph.D in Technological Sciences. He began his political career in 1996 when he was appointed as Hakim of the Jizzakh Region. He later became the Hakim of Samarqand Region in September 2001 and would keep this position until 2003. He was appointed by President Karimov as Prime Minister, to form a new cabinet to replace Oʻtkir Sultonov. He served in this position for 13 years until he took the post of acting president after the death of President Karimov in September 2016. Presidential elections were held in Uzbekistan on 4 December 2016 with Mirziyoyev winning 88.6% of the popular vote.

He was sworn in as President of Uzbekistan on 14 December 2016 during a ceremony in the Supreme Assembly, which coincided with its regular session. The ceremony was officiated by the Chairman Mirzo-Ulugbek Abdusalomov of the Uzbek Central Election Commission. Miziyoyev placed his hand on the country's Constitution and Quran as he took the oath of office.

Domestic policy

Appointments and removals 
Mirziyoyev worked hard to remove any controversial trace of the Karimov administration in his presidency. This also worked strategically, as some of Mirziyoyev's political adversaries such as Rustam Azimov and Rustam Inoyatov were opposed to many of his planned reforms. This period in his presidency was used to consolidate his power and remove all power struggles in the country. He appointed Abdusalom Azizov to head the defense ministry in September 2017, to succeed the long-time defense minister Qobul Berdiyev, who was seen as a Karimov loyalist. Azizov himself would be sacked from this position in February 2019, being transferred to the State Security Service to lead it after its head, Lieutenant General Ikhtiyor Abdullayev, was accused of tapping President Mirziyoyev's phone.

Economy 
There are many visible results of Mirziyoyev's reforms, which included the creation of more than 300,000 jobs and an increase in exports. Mirziyoyev secured 10 billion dollars in areas such as infrastructure, alternative energy and agriculture following talks with Crown Prince Mohammed bin Zayed in March 2019. In October 2020, he approved a list of state-owned properties and enterprises that are to be sold to the Uzbek private sector as a means of speeding up the privatization process in Uzbekistan.

Military policy 
Over the course of his presidency, he expanded educational opportunities in the Armed Forces of Uzbekistan establishing/reforming the following institutions: the Academy of the Armed Forces of Uzbekistan, the Military Institute of Information and Communication Technologies and Communications, the Military Medical Academy, and the Higher Military Aviation School. Since he came to power, the armed forces had been involved in rapidly re-arming its military with more modern equipment. In November 2017, at the initiative of President Mirziyoyev, the State Committee for Defense Industry was created serving as an authorized body for the management of the military–industrial complex.

Coronavirus pandemic 
Mirziyoyev was responsible for handling of the COVID-19 pandemic in Uzbekistan in 2020. He has been noted for being responsible for trying to coordinate efforts within Central Asia to combat the crisis. He launched the "Safe Travel Guaranteed" campaign as a way to reinvigorate the tourism sector, which included a compensation package for those infected with the virus while on holiday. In July, he reprimanded health minister Alisher Shodmonov and Mayor of Tashkent Jahongir Artikhojayev for failing to stop the spread of the virus. In August, he awarded honorary titles and medals to workers in healthcare and science who were on the frontlines of the pandemic. Earlier that month, he has instructed the government to ease lockdown measures step by step.

2022 Karakalpak protests 

On 1 July 2022 protests broke out in the autonomous region of Karakalpakstan over proposed amendments to the Constitution of Uzbekistan which would have ended Karakalpakstan's status as an autonomous region of Uzbekistan and right to secede from Uzbekistan via referendum. They were brutally suppressed, at least 18 people were killed.

Foreign policy 

Unlike Karimov, Mirziyoyev has moved to a more open foreign policy with Uzbekistan's neighbors, especially with the gradual improvement of relations with Kyrgyzstan and Tajikistan. Mirziyoyev has made it routine to visit foreign countries on state visits, with his first official foreign visit being to Ashgabat, Turkmenistan in March 2017. Mirziyoyev planned to visit 36 countries throughout 2019, some of which have never seen an official visit by an Uzbek president.

Over the course of his presidency, many foreign leaders visited Tashkent on state visits, including Kazakh President Kassym-Jomart Tokayev, Turkish President Recep Tayyip Erdoğan, Russian President Vladimir Putin, and Belarusian President Alexander Lukashenko.

Relations with Kyrgyzstan and Tajikistan 
On 5 September 2017, Mirziyoyev conducted a state visit to Kyrgyzstan, the first visit of its kind since 2000. A similar historic first visit was made in March 2018 to Dushanbe, Tajikistan. These were part of a bigger effort to improve relations with these two countries, which were riddled with tension primarily due to border disputes with those countries. In January 2017, regular commercial flights between Tashkent and Dushanbe resumed for the first time in 25 years.

Other former Soviet republics 
On 18 December 2020, he is chaired the summit of the Commonwealth of Independent States in Tashkent, likely through virtual means. That year was the first time that Uzbekistan assumed the presidency of the Council of Heads of State of the CIS. Congratulating Azeri President Ilham Aliyev on the victory in the 2020 Nagorno-Karabakh War, he pledged that Uzbekistan will to contribute to this process of restoration of the occupied territories, including mosques, and cultural sites. Mirziyoyev's former press secretary claimed that the 2021 Kyrgyzstan–Tajikistan conflict was "regulated as a result of personal intervention of President Shavkat Mirziyoyev."

Role in Afghanistan 

Mirziyoyev has made sure that Uzbekistan plays an important role in the peace talks between the Government of Afghanistan and the Taliban. In June of that year, the Uzbek foreign ministry, established diplomatic contacts with the terrorist organization. In August 2018, Mirziyoyev requested successfully that a Taliban delegation visit Tashkent to discuss Uzbekistan's role in the guaranteeing of peace in Afghanistan. In an address to his counterparts at a Commonwealth of Independent States summit in Dushanbe, Mirziyoyev extensively spoke of the instability in Afghanistan and the need to stop equipped and financed terrorist cells from leaving Syria and Iraq to go fight in Central Asia. In April 2019, he met with Zalmay Khalilzad, United States Special Representative for Afghanistan Reconciliation to discussed various avenues to take in order to stabilize the reconstruction of the Afghan economy. During his speech to the Seventy-fifth session of the United Nations General Assembly in 2020, during which he delivered his address in the Uzbek language (the first time that the language has been used in the UN), President Mirziyoyev discussed the "need to establish at the UN a Permanent Committee that will listen to the hopes and aspirations of the Afghan people".

Fight against terror

Operation Mehr 
Mirziyoyev's government began Operation Mehr (also known as Operation Compassion) in 2019 to return noncombatant citizens from camps in northeast Syria held by the Syrian Democratic Forces. On 10 October 2019, in accordance his instructions, 64 children were returned from Iraq to Tashkent as part of this operation. This was repeated during Ramadan in 2021.

Cabinet 

The current Prime Minister is Abdulla Aripov, who has designated the following members of the cabinet of ministers:

Residence 

Prior to 2016, the Ok Saroy Presidential Palace served as the official residence and workplace of the Uzbek President. In 2016, the title official residence was moved to the Kuksaroy Presidential Palace by order of President Mirziyoyev. Mirziyoyev has also used another residence located in the Qibray District of Tashkent which contains a presidential highway and compound. The interior is rumored to contain blue marble slabs from Argentina and Swarovski crystals.

Recognition 
November 2017 – He given the title of Honored Citizen of Seoul
April 2018 – He was awarded a Prize “For Merits to Eurasia” by the Government of Turkey
May 2018 – He was nominated for the Nobel Peace Prize by Olimzhon Tukhtanazarov of his own Liberal Democratic Party.
December 2018 – He was named the "Asian of the Year of 2018" by the Asia Journalist Association (AJA).
March 2018 – He was awarded the StrategEast Westernization Award

References

External links 
 Official Website of the President of Uzbekistan
 
 

2010s in Uzbekistan
2020s in Uzbekistan
Shavkat Mirziyoev